Pyrogen  may refer to:
 Pyrogen (fever), a fever inducing substance.
 Pyrogen (pyrotechnics), a pyrotechnic composition producing flame when heated by e.g. a bridgewire